Ian Ruff (born 16 December 1946) is an Australian competitive sailor and Olympic bronze medalist.

He won a bronze medal in the 470 class at the 1976 Summer Olympics in Montreal, along with his partner Ian Brown.

References

1946 births
Living people
Australian male sailors (sport)
Sailors at the 1976 Summer Olympics – 470
Olympic sailors of Australia
Olympic bronze medalists for Australia
Olympic medalists in sailing

Medalists at the 1976 Summer Olympics
20th-century Australian people